Mesembryanthemum crystallinum is a prostrate succulent plant native to Africa, Sinai and southern Europe, and naturalized in the New World. The plant is covered with large, glistening bladder cells or water vesicles, reflected in its common names of common ice plant, crystalline ice plant or ice plant.

Description

It flowers from March to October.

The species is covered with enlarged epidermal cells, called "bladder cells", the main function of which is to reserve water.
The plant can be annual, biennial or perennial, but its life cycle is usually completed within several months, depending on environmental conditions.

Biology 
The plant usually uses C3 carbon fixation, but when it becomes water- or salt-stressed, it is able to switch to Crassulacean acid metabolism. Like many salt-tolerant plants, M. crystallinum accumulates salt throughout its life, in a gradient from the roots to the shoots, with the highest concentration stored in epidermal bladder cells. The salt is released by leaching once the plant dies, resulting in a detrimental osmotic environment preventing the growth of other, non-salt-tolerant species while allowing M. crystallinum seeds to germinate.

In M. crystallinum, the number of seeds produced depends on whether CAM has been activated (C3 metabolism is more efficient) and the size the plant has grown to in its juvenile growth phase. Older portions of the plant progressively die off and dry out during seed production. The developing seed capsules continue to sequester salt and produce viable seeds. Seeds at the top of the capsule generally germinate immediately on imbibation, while seeds at the base may remain dormant for longer than four weeks.

Distribution and habitat
Mesembryanthemum crystallinum is native to Africa, Sinai and southern Europe, and naturalized in the Southwest of North America, as well as in South America and Australia. It is found on a wide range of soil types, from well-drained sandy soils (including sand dunes), to loamy and clay soils. It can tolerate nutritionally poor or saline soils (halophile), and grows well in disturbed sites such as roadsides, rubbish dumps and homestead yards.

Ecology
M. crystallinum is listed as an invasive species in North America, South America, and Australia. Its ability to grow in poor quality or saline soils and preference for disturbed areas are traits shared by many invasive plants which enable them to outcompete native species. In addition salt sequestration over the plant's lifetime, and the subsequent leaching into the soil upon its death, create an environment in which other plant's seeds struggle to germinate, allowing for the colonization of new areas with very little competition.

The plant is rarely, if ever, grazed upon by domestic stock.

Uses

The leaves are edible, as with some other members of the family Aizoaceae. The plant was once promoted in the United States and Europe as a vegetable similar to spinach, but failed to gain popularity. In southern Africa, the leaves and stems are gathered from the wild and pickled. In Japan, the plant has become a common vegetable sold in supermarkets after Saga University succeeded in hydroponic cultivation of a commercial quantity in 2009; the vegetable goes by the names ice plant (アイスプラント), salt leaf (ソルトリーフ) and barafu (バラフ). The seeds are also edible.

The crushed leaves can be used as a soap substitute and have medicinal uses. Ice plants are also used in South Africa as a way of deterring fires, or "firescaping" gardens. It is also cultivated for ornamentation. Due to its salt accumulation, M. crystallinum may be useful for bioremediation.

References

External links

crystallinum
Barilla plants
Drought-tolerant plants
Flora of Africa
Flora of Europe
Garden plants
Groundcovers
Leaf vegetables
Plants described in 1753
Taxa named by Carl Linnaeus